Ames may refer to:

Businesses and organisations
 Ames (automobile), an early American automobile manufacturer
 Ames (department store), a defunct discount store chain based in Connecticut, U.S.
 Ames Manufacturing Company, an American manufacturer of swords, tools and cutlery 
 Ames Research Center, NASA research center in California, U.S.
 Ames True Temper, a multinational manufacturer of non-powered lawn and garden products
 Academy for Math, Engineering, and Science (AMES) in Salt Lake City, Utah, U.S.

People
 Ames (surname), including a list of people with the name
 Ames family, a prominent family of the United States

Places

United States
 Ames, Arkansas, a place in Arkansas
 Ames, Colorado
 Ames, Illinois
 Ames, Indiana
 Ames, Iowa, the most populous city bearing this name
 Ames, Kansas
 Ames, Nebraska
 Ames, New York
Ames Township, Athens County, Ohio
 Ames, Oklahoma
 Ames, Texas
 Ames, West Virginia

Other places
 Ames, Pas-de-Calais, France
 Ames, Spain
 Ames Range, a mountain range in Antarctica

Other uses
 Ames, standard author abbreviation in botany for Oakes Ames
 AMES, Air Ministry Experimental Station, the basis for naming British radar systems through World War 2

See also 

 Ames Airport (disambiguation)
 Ames Building (disambiguation)
 Amesville, Ohio, U.S.
 Amesdale, Ontario, Canada
 Amesbury (disambiguation)
 Amess, a surname
 Apparent mineralocorticoid excess syndrome, or AME